Pat Sheehan may refer to:

Pat Sheehan (journalist), retired American male journalist
Pat Sheehan (model) (1931–2006), American actress and model
Pat Sheehan (Irish republican) (born 1958), Irish republican activist and politician

See also
Patrick Sheehan (disambiguation)